Lacon can refer to:

People
 Demetrius Lacon (late 2nd century BC), Greek philosopher
 Lacon family, a Sardinian dynasty
 Lacon baronets, of the English baronetcy
 William Lacon (ca. 1540–1609), English politician
 Roland Lacon (ca. 1537–1608), English politician
 Edmund Lacon (1807–1888), English politician
 Lacon D. Stockton, judge in Iowa, USA in 1856–1860
 Oliver Lacon, a character in spy novels of John le Carré

Places
 Lacon, Alabama
 Lacon, Illinois
 Lacon Township, Marshall County, Illinois

Other
 Lacon (beetle), a click beetle genus
 L.A.con (disambiguation), four World Science Fiction Conventions held in Anaheim, California, United States

See also
 Laconia (disambiguation)